Pierre-Charles Bridan (1766–1836) was a French sculptor.

Pierre-Charles Bridan was a pupil of his father, the sculptor Charles-Antoine Bridan. He attended the Académie royale de peinture et de sculpture where he won the Prix de Rome in 1791. Around 1812, he participated in the project to design of the Elephant of the Bastille. Bridan completed the plaster full-scale model of the elephant in 1814.

References
 Museum of painting and sculpture, or, Collection of the principal pictures, statues and bas-reliefs of public and private collections of Europe. Drawn and engraved etchings by Wake, with descriptive notes, critical and historical by Louis René Ménard page 39

1766 births
1836 deaths
18th-century French sculptors
French male sculptors
19th-century French sculptors
Artists from Paris
19th-century French male artists
18th-century French male artists